is a Japanese film director.

Filmography
 Umi no Yume, Tokai no Kyo (2004)
 Break Out  (2005)
  (2005)
  (2006)
 Gojū no Tō (2007)
  (2007)
  (2008)
  (2009)
Rupan no kiganjô (ルパンの奇蹟) (2011)
Kumo no ito (雲の伊藤) (2011)

Sources
 
 
 

Japanese film directors
Living people
Year of birth missing (living people)